is a 2021 adventure drama film directed by Arthur Harari and written by the director and Vincent Poymiro, with the collaboration of Bernard Cendron, freely inspired by the life of Hiroo Onoda. It is an international co-production between France, Japan, Germany, Belgium, Italy, and Cambodia.

The film stars Yuya Endo as Onoda, a Japanese soldier who refused to believe that World War II had ended and continued to fight on a remote Philippine island until 1974. It is particularly inspired by Cendron and Gérard Chenu's 1974 biography Onoda, seul en guerre dans la jungle and on Cendron's archives and Harari's conversations with him. It is not based on Onoda's own memoirs, and Harari considers the film fiction inspired by history rather than a biographical film.

Cast

Release 

The film opened the Un Certain Regard section of the 2021 Cannes Film Festival on 7 July 2021.

It was released in cinemas in the United Kingdom and Ireland by Third Window Films on 15 April 2022.

Critical reception 

On RogerEbert.com, Ben Kenigsburg writes: "Technically, "Onoda"... is a biopic, but it never plays like one. This austere, bleak, occasionally even darkly funny film is, at nearly three hours, more like an absurdist slow burn." James Lattimer, writing for Sight and Sound, called it "...a nearly three-hour wannabe existentialist war drama intended as an exercise in the sort of big-screen immersion that has been impossible of late... [T]he film's humdrum dramatization lacks the necessary visual or narrative finesse to keep viewers absorbed."

Accolades 

The film won the Prix Louis-Delluc for 2021. At the 11th Magritte Awards, it received a nomination in the category of Best Foreign Film in Coproduction.

References

External links 

 Official international sales page at Le Pacte
 U.K. and Ireland official page at Third Window Films
 

2020s adventure drama films
2020s survival films
2021 biographical drama films
2021 films
Adventure films based on actual events
Belgian survival films
French adventure drama films
French biographical drama films
French historical adventure films
French survival films
French war adventure films
German adventure drama films
German historical adventure films
Italian adventure drama films
Italian historical adventure films
Japanese adventure drama films
Japanese historical adventure films
Jungle adventure films
2020s French films